Melica eremophila is a species of grass that is native to South America.

Description
The species is perennial with short rhizomes. The plant stem is smooth while the leaf-sheaths are scabrous, tubular, and are closed on one end. The leaf-blades are flat and are glabrous with scabrous surface and ciliated margins. The main branches are appressed. The panicles have curved, filiform and pubescent pedicels which are hairy above. They are comprised out of 1 fertile floret which is diminished at the apex.

Its lemma have ciliate margins and scabrous surface with obtuse apex. Both low and upper glumes are membranous and have an obtuse apexes, but are different in size. Also, both glumes have acute apexes. It sterile florets are barren, orbicular, and grow in a clump.

References

eremophila